The Canton of Rennes-Sud-Ouest is a former canton of France, in the Ille-et-Vilaine département. It had 34,059 inhabitants (2012). It was disbanded following the French canton reorganisation which came into effect in March 2015.

The canton contained the following communes:
 Rennes (partly)
 Saint-Jacques-de-la-Lande
 Vezin-le-Coquet

References

Former cantons of Ille-et-Vilaine
Canton Rennes Sud Ouest
2015 disestablishments in France
States and territories disestablished in 2015